A. Tamilarasi Ravikumar (born 5 April 1976) is the current member of Tamil Nadu Legislative Assembly elected from Manamadurai constituency in the 2021 election. She was the former Minister for Adi-Dravidar and Tribal Welfare in Tamil Nadu state of India. She was born in Paramakudi and has obtained her bachelor's degree in Commerce. She was elected to the Tamil Nadu legislative assembly from Samayanallur constituency in 2006 election as a Dravida Munnetra Kazhagam candidate.

References 

Dravida Munnetra Kazhagam politicians
1976 births
Living people
Tamil Nadu ministers
21st-century Indian women politicians
21st-century Indian politicians
Tamil Nadu MLAs 2021–2026
Women members of the Tamil Nadu Legislative Assembly